Jabba may refer to:

 Jabba the Hutt, a fictional character in the Star Wars franchise
 Jabba (presenter) (Jason Davis, born 1973), Australian actor and media personality
 DJ Jabba (Steven Beckford), American DJ and event promoter
 JABBA, the Japan Basketball Association
 Jabba language, or Hyam language

See also

Jaba (disambiguation)
Jaber (disambiguation)
Jabbawockeez, an American hip-hop dance crew
Jabirr Jabirr, an Indigenous Australian people, sometimes spelt Jabba Jabba